Wyndham William Pretoria Haines (14 July 1900 – 5 November 1974) was an English footballer who played at centre-forward for south coast rivals, Portsmouth and then Southampton in the 1920s and 1930s.

Football career
Haines was born at Warminster Common in Wiltshire and went to the local school at Sambourne where he was a member of the school football team. As a youth he played for Warminster Town before joining Frome Town in the Western League, from where he joined Portsmouth (then playing in the Football League Third Division South) in December 1922.

Portsmouth
In his first season at Fratton Park, Haines made only six appearances, scoring three goals. In the following season, however, he displaced Alf Strange and became the first-choice centre-forward, scoring 28 goals from 30 league appearances, making him the division's top scorer as they won the Football League Third Division South championship.

Haines was nicknamed "Farmers Boy" and became something of a legend at Fratton Park, where the Pompey fans would often voice their approval of his forward play with a rendition of the popular refrain "To be a farmer's boy". As a centre-forward he had a style of his own and, rather than dashing around the field, he preferred to play at a more leisurely pace. He seldom tried to strike the ball hard, but preferred to place it with "tantalising precision".

In Portsmouth's first season in the Second Division, Haines shared the goal-scoring with Jerry Mackie with both players scoring 17 goals as Pompey finished in a creditable fourth place in the table. Haines was top-scorer in the next two seasons with 20 goals in 1925–26 when Portsmouth finished in mid-table, and 40 goals from 42 appearances in 1926–27 as Pompey gained promotion to the First Division as runners-up, squeezing out Manchester City on goal average, by a margin of just 0.006. Haines's goal tally included a hat-trick scored in a 9–1 victory over Notts County on 9 April 1927 – this remains Portsmouth's record margin of victory. Going into the final match of the season, Portsmouth and Manchester City were on the same number of points with near identical goal averages. The match between Manchester City and Bradford City had started before Portsmouth's match against Preston North End and finished 8–0. At this time, Portsmouth were also winning 4–1 but needed to score one more goal to take the runners-up spot. Haines managed to score the vital goal in the final minutes of the game, thus sending Portsmouth up by the narrowest of margins.

For Portsmouth's first season in the top flight, Haines shared the goal-scoring with newly recruited Jack Smith, both scoring 11 goals, with fellow forwards David Watson and Welsh international Fred Cook both contributing ten, as they narrowly avoided relegation, finishing in 20th place in the table. By the end of the season, Haines was out of favour with new manager Jack Tinn who was building a team for the future with Jack Weddle taking over the position of centre-forward.

In May 1928, Haines moved up the Solent to join local rivals Southampton. In his six seasons at Fratton Park, Haines scored 129 goals from 179 appearances in all competitions.

Southampton
At Southampton, Haines joined a club which had been struggling financially and on the pitch. He linked up with his former Portsmouth colleague, Jerry Mackie, and was an immediate success. On 3 November 1928, he scored four goals in an 8–2 victory over Blackpool at The Dell — this was the first four-goal haul since the club had joined the Football League in 1920. Haines' 16 goals were a major factor in the Saints finishing fourth in the Second Division table.

Haines was a "well-built country boy" who soon became as popular at The Dell as he had been at Fratton Park. Despite his build and power, he would often take penalties without a run-up.

In the following season, Haines was injured in September and lost his place at centre-forward to Dick Rowley before returning to the side in February 1930. He marked his return by scoring five goals in the first three matches back and ended the season with 15 goals from 19 appearances. By now, manager Arthur Chadwick was forced to sell players to improve the club's finances, and Rowley had been sold to Tottenham Hotspur in February. At the time of his departure, Rowley had scored 25 goals from 25 league appearances and with him went Saints' last hopes of promotion, and they finished seventh in the table.
 
Haines missed the first half of the 1930–31 season because of injury, returning to the side on 27 December. Once back in the side, he embarked on a goal-scoring run with seven goals in his first four games and went on to become top scorer for the club with 15 goals from 21 appearances.

In his final season at The Dell, Haines was plagued by injuries and was only able to make three appearances, with various players including Arthur Haddleton and Johnny McIlwaine unsuccessfully trying to replace him at centre-forward before the emergence of Ted Drake from the reserves.

Haines retired in the summer of 1932, having scored a creditable 47 goals from 71 first-team appearances for the Saints.

Weymouth
In September 1932, he returned to the Western League with Weymouth, for whom he scored 275 goals in 205 appearances.

Life after football
In 1935, Haines had become the landlord of the Vine Inn, Frome, Somerset which he ran until 1949. He later moved into the dry cleaning business.

In 1960, he became the president of the Portsmouth Supporters Club.

Honours
Portsmouth
Football League Third Division South championship: 1923–24
Football League Second Division runners-up: 1926–27

References

1900 births
People from Warminster
1974 deaths
English footballers
English Football League players
Portsmouth F.C. players
Southampton F.C. players
Weymouth F.C. players
Frome Town F.C. players
Association football forwards